Coombe Bissett is a village and civil parish in the English county of Wiltshire in the River Ebble valley,  southwest of Salisbury on the A354 road that goes south towards Blandford Forum.  

The parish includes the village of Homington, to the east towards the village of Odstock.

History
Records from Saxon times indicate that the Ebble valley was a thriving area, the River Ebble also being known as the River Chalke. 

The Domesday Book in 1086 divided the Chalke Valley into eight manors: Chelke (Chalke – Bowerchalke and Broadchalke), Eblesborne (Ebbesbourne Wake), Fifehide (Fifield Bavant),  Cumbe (Coombe Bissett), Humitone (Homington), Odestoche (Odstock), Stradford (Stratford Tony and Bishopstone) and Trow (circa Alvediston). 

The Domesday Book also recorded Cumbe as a royal manor with 85 households, while Humitone had just two households.

A medieval packhorse bridge, now a footbridge, crosses the Ebble close to the current road bridge at Coombe Bissett.

Coombe Bissett and Homington were separate parishes, each with its own church, until they were united in a joint benefice in 1885. 

Homington was absorbed into Coombe Bissett civil parish in 1934.

Religious sites 

The two Anglican churches below are served by the Chalke Valley team ministry.

St Michael's, Coombe Bissett 

The oldest part of St Michael's, the south aisle, is from the 12th century. The chancel was built in the 13th and the tower (with stair-turret) added in the 14th; the nave and north transept are 15th-century. 

Restoration in 1845 by T.H. Wyatt included the rebuilding of the west front, reducing the length of the building. The church is a Grade I listed building.

St Mary's, Homington 

St Mary's is a 14th-century church, possibly with earlier origins. The tower of the present church is from the early 17th century and there was extensive restoration in the 1860s. The church is a Grade II* listed building.

Nonconformist chapels 
A Primitive Methodist chapel was built in 1841 at the west end of Homington village, then rebuilt in 1877. The chapel closed in 1967 and is now a private house.

In 1895 a Baptist chapel was opened at Coombe Bissett, on the road to Homington, and is used by the Coombe Fellowship.

Amenities
Coombe Bissett has a pub, the Fox and Goose, a village hall, and a shop with a post office.
A primary school was built at Shutts Lane in the 1960s, replacing a small National School on the Homington road which was built in 1845.
Homington and Coombe Bissett Downs is a nature reserve on nearby chalk downland.
There are various clubs within the village, including a tennis club, cricket club and badminton club. 
Salisbury and South Wiltshire Golf Course is to the north of the village.
Salisbury Hospital is to the east, north of Odstock village and a 10-minute drive from Coombe Bissett.

Notable people
Tancred Borenius (1885–1948), Finnish art historian, died at Laverstock House hospital and is buried in Coombe Bissett churchyard.

Bordering areas

References

External links

Villages in Wiltshire
Civil parishes in Wiltshire